Karl Stefan Aichelburg (22 February 1782 – 6 December 1817) (German: Karl Stefan Freiherr von Aichelburg. Also Charles, Baron d'Aichelbourg) was a mandolin virtuoso and composer who lived at the beginning of the nineteenth century in Vienna and there wrote Opus 1, Potpourri for mandolin (or violin) and guitar, Opus 2, Variations for mandolin and guitar, Opus 3, Nocturne concertantes for mandolin and guitar and Opus 4, Variations concertantes for mandolin and guitar. The above compositions were published by Haslinger, Vienna.

Also known as Karl Stefan, Baron of Aichelbourg. He was born in Vienna to an artistic family.

Compositions
Variationen über ein beliebtes Thema aus der Oper "Die Schweizerfamilie" 
Variationen über ein eigenes Thema op. 2 ; für Mandoline und Gitarre 
Variationen über ein eigenes Thema 
Variationen über ein beliebtes Thema aus der Oper "Die Schweizerfamilie" für Mandoline und Gitarre 
Notturno op. 3 für Mandoline und Gitarre 
Notturni, Md Git op. 3

See also
Academic paper on Aichelburg and his music (in German)

References

1782 births
1817 deaths
Austrian classical musicians
Austrian Classical-period composers
Austrian male classical composers
Austrian mandolinists
19th-century Austrian musicians
19th-century Austrian male musicians
19th-century classical composers